River Pines is a census-designated place in Amador County, California. A post office opened at River Pines in 1948; it has the zip code of 95675. River Pines has a population of 379 (2010 census).

History
In the 1920s, the growing middle class looked for weekend or summer vacation property to buy a cabin amid the pines. Developers Roy and Helen Brooke found suitable land along the south fork of the Cosumnes in the Bridgeport district, and developed River Pines Resort to sell cabin sites.

By damming the river, the resort developed water activities and sports. With the resort thriving for a time, the Brookes subdivided more land for lots. In time, the resort became just another rural, remote community with a post office and store and much privacy.

By May 1926, Brooke had engaged Cassius M Phinney, surveyor and civil engineer, to subdivide some of the property bounded northerly by the Cosumnes River, and southerly by the Plymouth-Aukum county road.

Demographics
The 2010 United States Census reported that River Pines had a population of 379. The racial makeup of River Pines was 324 (85.5%) White, 0 (0.0%) African American, 5 (1.3%) Native American, 4 (1.1%) Asian, 0 (0.0%) Pacific Islander, 8 (2.1%) from other races, and 38 (10.0%) from two or more races. Hispanic or Latino of any race were 31 persons (8.2%).

The Census reported that 379 people (100% of the population) lived in households, 0 (0%) lived in non-institutionalized group quarters, and 0 (0%) were institutionalized.

There were 157 households, out of which 46 (29.3%) had children under the age of 18 living in them, 71 (45.2%) were opposite-sex married couples living together, 17 (10.8%) had a female householder with no husband present, 11 (7.0%) had a male householder with no wife present. There were 16 (10.2%) unmarried opposite-sex partnerships, and 0 (0%) same-sex married couples or partnerships. 44 households (28.0%) were made up of individuals, and 15 (9.6%) had someone living alone who was 65 years of age or older. The average household size was 2.41. There were 99 families (63.1% of all households); the average family size was 2.94.

The population was spread out, with 81 people (21.4%) under the age of 18, 36 people (9.5%) aged 18 to 24, 68 people (17.9%) aged 25 to 44, 148 people (39.1%) aged 45 to 64, and 46 people (12.1%) who were 65 years of age or older. The median age was 45.6 years. For every 100 females, there were 84.0 males. For every 100 females age 18 and over, there were 96.1 males.

The homeowner vacancy rate was 2.6%; the rental vacancy rate was 16.1%.  242 people (63.9% of the population) lived in owner-occupied housing units and 137 people (36.1%) lived in rental housing units.

References

Census-designated places in Amador County, California
Census-designated places in California